Biagio Mazzella, O.P. (died 1664) was a Roman Catholic prelate who served as Bishop of Sant'Agata de' Goti (1663–1664)
and Bishop of Strongoli (1655–1663).

Biography
Biagio Mazzella was born in Naples, Italy and ordained a priest in the Order of Preachers.
On 25 Oct 1655, he was appointed during the papacy of Pope Alexander VII as Bishop of Strongoli.
In Nov 1655, he was consecrated bishop by Giovanni Battista Maria Pallotta, Cardinal-Priest of San Pietro in Vincoli. 
On 26 Feb 1663, he was appointed during the papacy of Pope Alexander VII as Bishop of Sant'Agata de' Goti.
He served as Bishop of Sant'Agata de' Goti until his death in 1664.

References

External links and additional sources
 (for Chronology of Bishops) 
 (for Chronology of Bishops)  
 (for Chronology of Bishops) 
 (for Chronology of Bishops) 

17th-century Italian Roman Catholic bishops
Bishops appointed by Pope Alexander VII
1664 deaths